Horace Edgar Herring (1884–9 January 1962) was a New Zealand Member of Parliament for Mid-Canterbury. Born in England and a mechanical engineer and draughtsman, he came to New Zealand in 1909.

Member of Parliament

Horace Herring represented the Mid-Canterbury electorate for the Labour Party between 1935 and 1938.

He was a supporter of John A. Lee and stood as a Democratic Labour Party candidate at the 1943 Christchurch East by-election, which was won by Mabel Howard. Horace Herring received a very creditable 2,578 votes; 26.7% of the total cast. Labour MP Ormond Wilson, described Herring as "a character only Dickens could have invented". (See also a description of his Maiden Speech in Parliament.)

Herring was awarded the Coronation Medal in 1937 for services to New Zealand.

He was Mayor of Levin from 1953 to 1956.

Notes

References

 
 
 
 

Independent MPs of New Zealand
Mayors of places in Manawatū-Whanganui
New Zealand Labour Party MPs
New Zealand MPs for South Island electorates
Members of the New Zealand House of Representatives
1884 births
1962 deaths
Democratic Labour Party (New Zealand) politicians
Unsuccessful candidates in the 1938 New Zealand general election
British emigrants to New Zealand